The British Tenpin Bowling Association (BTBA) is the official governing body of Tenpin Bowling in the United Kingdom, affiliated to Sport England.

It is the official sanctioning body, recognised by International Bowling Federation, the sport's world governing body, for all competitions, leagues and tournaments held in the UK, and is the organisation responsible for the protection, integrity and development of the sport. It also oversees coaching for tenpin bowling at all levels, and is the official awarding body for formal coaching qualifications. The BTBA had a monthly magazine to keep members up to date with the latest news in the sport but nowadays news can mainly be found on Facebook.

History
The first British tenpin bowling centre opened at Stamford Hill. The two principal American manufacturers of tenpin machinery - AMF and Brunswick - had expanded their operations to the UK when it became apparent that they had virtually saturated their home market in the US at the end of the 1950s. The American Bowling Congress (ABC) took an interest in this expansion and helped British bowlers to set up their own governing body.

The BTBA was formed on 26 May 1961. The General Secretary was Maurice Glazer, at that time a professional photographer in Dalston, East London. His shop became the first official residence of the Association. One of its original roles was to provide official recognition for newcomers to the fledgling sport of tenpin bowling as it grew in popularity across the UK.

It standardised rules and playing regulations, laid down guidelines and provided an independent governing body to which reference could be made in the event of disagreement.

The rule-book was copied almost verbatim from the ABC version. The annual membership subscription was five shillings), which at the prevailing exchange rate was the Sterling equivalent of the ABC's annual subscription of US$1. With about half-a-million members the ABC found this rate to provide them with adequate funds, but it was insufficient to run the BTBA, given that only a few thousand British bowlers were members.

Authority was delegated to each of the counties under the auspices of local area representatives. Some of the area representatives soon came into conflict with the bowling centre proprietors, for example insisting on costly re-surfacing of lanes, which they argued was unnecessary. The proprietors rebelled and set up their own rival organisation, the Tenpin Bowling Proprietors Association (TBPA), in 1967. An Annual General Meeting of the BTBA saw this conflict rise to a head and most of the governing council resigned, leaving Glazer to regroup and bring back all decisions to the BTBA head office. It took several years to achieve a rapprochement with the proprietors.

Glazer continued to follow his instincts in what he believed to be the best interest of British bowlers, became President of FIQ and was awarded an MBE for his service to the sport.

The BTBA has continued to have a considerable impact on the sport, however in recent times has struggled to engage with the next generation of bowlers. As bowling transitions from "sport" to "leisure", and bowling centres remove restrictions like the need to wear Bowling Shoes, Bowling as a sport is in huge decline in the UK. A large percentage of bowling leagues did not return to the centres after the COVID pandemic.

Members
Current members include the Hollywood Bowl, and Tenpin (formerly Megabowl) chains.

References

External links
Official BTBA website
Tenpin Bowling Proprietors Association
Scottish Tenpin Bowling Association Popular
British University Tenpin Bowling Association - University Bowling in England

Bowling organizations
Tenpin Bowling Association
Tenpin bowling in the United Kingdom
Sports organisations of the United Kingdom
1961 establishments in the United Kingdom
Sports organizations established in 1961